The women's tournament in sitting volleyball at the 2016 Summer Paralympics was held between 9–17 September 2016. The USA won the event for the first time beating China in the final.

Results
The USA won the event for the first time beating China in the final.

Preliminary round

Group A

Group B

Knock-out stage

Bracket

Classification 7th / 8th

Classification 5th / 6th

Semi-finals

Bronze medal game

Gold medal game

Final ranking

See also
 Sitting volleyball at the 2016 Summer Paralympics – Men

References

Volleyball at the 2016 Summer Paralympics